Lovedrive is the sixth studio album by German band Scorpions, released in 1979. Considered by some critics to be the pinnacle of their career, Lovedrive was a major evolution of the band's sound, exhibiting their "classic style" that would be later developed over their next few albums. Lovedrive cemented the "Scorpions formula" of hard rock songs combined with melodic ballads.

Lovedrive was the band’s first album to be released by Harvest Records in Europe and Mercury Records in the United States and Canada following the band's departure from RCA. It proved to be a major commercial breakthrough, reaching No. 55 on the Billboard Top 200, which none of their previous five albums had dented at all. The RIAA certified the record as Gold on 28 May 1986, and the album also proved a breakthrough in the United Kingdom where it was the first Scorpions album to chart and peaked at No. 36.

Lovedrive ranked No. 25 on IGN's 2007 list of the Top 25 metal albums.

Line-up changes
This is the first album to feature Matthias Jabs on lead guitar, and thus the first record to feature the band's "classic" lineup. Jabs replaced Uli Jon Roth who went on to form his own band, Electric Sun.

Michael Schenker, younger brother of rhythm guitarist Rudolf, had just split from UFO. He recorded lead guitars on "Another Piece of Meat", "Coast to Coast", "Holiday", "Loving You Sunday Morning" and "Lovedrive". At the beginning of the Scorpions' German tour in February 1979, Michael rejoined the band and the group reluctantly parted ways with Matthias Jabs. However, in April 1979 while the band was touring in France, Michael quit, which led to Jabs' immediate return after intense negotiations.

Artwork
The original album cover depicted a well dressed man and woman seated in the back of a car, with the woman's right breast exposed and connected to the man's hand by stretched bubblegum. The back cover featured the same man and woman, but holding a photograph of the band, and with the woman's left breast completely exposed without any gum.  It was created by Storm Thorgerson of the design firm Hipgnosis. It caused some controversy in the US upon the album's release, with later pressings of the album bearing a simple design of a blue scorpion on a black background. The original uncensored art was restored for the remaster series.

Recalling the cover photo with the woman and the car, Thorgerson remarked: "Not exactly the most politically correct scene you've ever seen. I thought it was funny, but women read a different inflection into it now."

In a 2010 interview, singer Klaus Meine commented on the album cover, stating: "We just did not know it would be a problem in America, it was just sex and rock 'n' roll. It is odd that in America some of these covers were a problem, because in the '80s when we would tour here, we always had boobs flashed to us at the front of the stage. Nowhere else in the world, just here. We just did not think it would be a problem to put out a record like Lovedrive in America."

Track listing

Personnel
Scorpions
 Klaus Meine – lead vocals
 Rudolf Schenker – rhythm guitar, backing vocals
 Matthias Jabs – lead guitar, backing vocals
 Francis Buchholz – bass, backing vocals
 Herman Rarebell – drums, backing vocals
 Michael Schenker – lead guitar, backing vocals

Production
Dieter Dierks – producer, engineer, mixing
Steve Fallone – mastering

Charts

Album

Singles

Certifications

References

Scorpions (band) albums
1979 albums
Albums with cover art by Hipgnosis
Harvest Records albums
Mercury Records albums
Albums produced by Dieter Dierks
Obscenity controversies in music